Kuancheng may refer to:

Kuancheng Manchu Autonomous County, in Hebei, China
Kuancheng District, in Changchun, Jilin, China